Denis Marconato (born July 29, 1975) is an Italian former professional basketball player. At a height of 2.11 m (6'11") tall, he played at the center position.

Professional career
Marconato joined Benetton Treviso's youth team in 1990, and with them he won three Italian juniors club titles between 1991 and 1994. In 1993, he made his debut in Italy's top-tier level men's professional LBA, with the senior team of Benetton Treviso, in the 1992–93 season. However, he did not have a regular place on Treviso's roster, so he was loaned to Padova, where he demonstrated his talent. In the 1996–97 season, he returned to Benetton Treviso, where the team's head coach Mike D'Antoni, gave him a more important role in the team; and in that season, Marconato won his first Italian League championship. After winning the Italian SuperCup title and MVP in 1997, and the FIBA Saporta Cup title in 1999, he was named the MVP of the Italian Cup Final Eight in 2000 (which was won by Treviso).

In the following years, he won two more Italian championships (2002, 2003), three more Italian Cups (2003, 2004, 2005) and played at two EuroLeague Final Fours (2002, 2003). During his last season with Treviso, Marconato was also the captain of the team. In the summer of 2005, he moved to the Spanish ACB League club FC Barcelona, together with his senior Italian national team teammate Gianluca Basile. On January 14, 2015, he signed with Montichiari of the Italian 3rd Division.

National team career
Marconato played at the 1994 FIBA Europe Under-20 Championship with the Italian under-20 junior national team, and he also played at the 1996 FIBA Europe Under-22 Championship, which was held in Istanbul. After that, he was a regular member of the senior Italian national team, with which he won a gold medal at the 1999 EuroBasket, a bronze medal at the 2003 EuroBasket, and a silver medal at the 2004 Athens Summer Olympic Games. In addition, Marconato was also a member of the Italian roster at the 2006 FIBA World Championship.

Honors and awards

Junior club career
3× Italian Junior Club Champion: (1991, 1992, 1994)

Pro career
2× FIBA Saporta Cup Champion: (1995, 1999)
4× Italian League Champion: (1997, 2002, 2003, 2010)
4× Italian SuperCup Winner: (1997, 2001, 2002, 2009)
4× EuroLeague Final Four Participant: (1998, 2002, 2003, 2006)
8× Italian Cup Winner: (1993, 1994, 1995, 2000, 2003, 2004, 2005, 2010)
Spanish Cup Winner: (2007)
Italian 3rd Division Cup Winner: (2015)

Italian senior national team
FIBA EuroBasket 1997: 
FIBA EuroBasket 1999: 
FIBA EuroBasket 2003: 
2004 Summer Olympic Games:

Individual awards
Italian Super Cup MVP: (1997)
Italian Cup MVP: (2000)
Officer of the Order of Merit of the Italian Republic - Rome, 27 September 2004. The initiative of the President of the Republic.

References

External links
Euroleague.net Profile
FIBA.com Profile
Eurobasket.com Profile
Italian League Profile 
Spanish League Profile 

1975 births
Living people
2006 FIBA World Championship players
Basketball players at the 2000 Summer Olympics
Basketball players at the 2004 Summer Olympics
Centers (basketball)
Dinamo Sassari players
FC Barcelona Bàsquet players
FIBA EuroBasket-winning players
Gipuzkoa Basket players
Italian expatriate basketball people in Spain
Italian men's basketball players
Knights Grand Cross of the Order of Merit of the Italian Republic
Lega Basket Serie A players
Liga ACB players
Medalists at the 2004 Summer Olympics
Mens Sana Basket players
Olimpia Milano players
Olympic basketball players of Italy
Olympic medalists in basketball
Olympic silver medalists for Italy
Pallacanestro Cantù players
Pallacanestro Petrarca Padova players
Pallacanestro Treviso players
Sportspeople from Treviso
Reyer Venezia players